La polizia è sconfitta (internationally titled Stunt Squad and Elimination Force) is a 1977 Italian poliziottesco film directed by Domenico Paolella. The character of Valli, played by Vittorio Mezzogiorno, was defined as "perhaps the most gruesome and ruthless villain of the Italian crime cinema."

Plot    
A tough police inspector forms a special squad of motorcycle cops in order to track down a psychotic racketeer and his gang.

Cast 
Marcel Bozzuffi as Inspector Grifi
Riccardo Salvino as Agent Brogi
Vittorio Mezzogiorno as Valli
Claudia Giannotti as Anna 
Francesco Ferracini as Platania
Pasquale Basile as Marshall Marchetti
Nello Pazzafini as the Tunisian
Alfredo Zammi as Giovanni Corsi
Andrea Aureli as Giovanni, the Bar Owner

See also      
 List of Italian films of 1977

References

External links

1977 films
Poliziotteschi films
Films directed by Domenico Paolella
Films scored by Stelvio Cipriani
Films set in Emilia-Romagna
1970s Italian-language films
1970s Italian films